Karavaloor is a village situated in Kollam district in the Indian state of Kerala.

Geography 
It sits approximately 65 km from the state capital, Thiruvananthapuram and approximately 5 km from Punalur on the Punalur-Thiruvananthapuram road. 

Nearby villages include Poikayil, Ayanikode, Neelammal, Venchempu, and Mathra, where the Panchayath administrative office is located.

Native plants include natural rubber, banana, jackfruit, black pepper, guava, and Syzygium samarangense, with an abundance of Paddy fields and natural streams.

History 
Karavaloor can also be written as Karavalur. The name is derived from the legend of Shri Peedika Bhagavathy, the Goddess of Karavaloor, who appeared to the village with a Karaval ( കരവാള്‍, Sword in Dravidian Etymology) after she was called for their protection. The suffix Uru is Proto-Dravidian for "village".

It was once part of the Venad Kingdoms which laid the foundation for the later Chera kingdom. It developed trade links with Kollam Port and traded in spices and herbs as was common in the period.

Demographics 
Proto-Australoid tribes like the Kuravar, Pulayar and Paraiyar make up the native ancestral population. Minority groups include the Nair, the Ezhava, Saint Thomas Christians, and the Mappila. 

The Karavaloor village has population of 23,947 of which 11,288 are males while 12,659 are females as per Population Census 2011.

Karavaloor village has higher literacy rate compared to Kerala. In 2011, literacy rate of Karavaloor village was 95.37 % compared to 94.00 % of Kerala. In Karavaloor Male literacy stands at 96.93 % while female literacy rate was 94.01 %.

Religion 

Native Animism, Hinduism, Christianity, Islam and Tribal Religions are practiced.

Karavaloor features the Karavaloor Peedika Bhagavathy Goddess Temple, where Bhadrakali is the presiding deity. The annual festival of this temple is known for its processions. 

Active temples include Padinjattinkara Shiva Temple, Paanayam Shiva Temple, Mathra Shiva Temple, and Murikolilkavu Parvathy Temple. They are worship sites, along with almost a dozen sacred groves that denote nature. 

Churches are present, such as Karavaloor Bethel Marthoma Church (attracting more than 500 families), Kereeth Marthoma Church, St. Benedict Malankara Syrian Catholic Church, St. George Orthodox Church and Nithya Sahaya Matha Church.

Pentecostal churches include Assemblies of God churches, Church of God and many Independent Pentecostal churches.

Economy 
Key aspects of the local economy are rubber harvesting, banking, and remittances from migrant workers.

Education 
The village has two secondary schools, Karavaloor (AMMHS, established under the patronage of the Mar Thoma Syrian Church) which was first established by the Koipuram Family and Venchempu higher secondary school (NGPMHS). Neelammal is a government-run school for lower primary students. Private schools include the Oxford Central school and Carmel Central School.

Politics
Karavaloor is part of the Punalur constituency and is home to many state ministers and leaders.

P.C Baby was the first panchayath president. The village is governed by a UDF majority committee. Advocate Jisha Murali is the panchayath president.

Transport

 Punalur KSRTC Bus Station (5 km)
 Kollam KSRTC Bus Station (Quilon) (40 km)
 Punalur Railway Station (6 km)
 Kollam Railway Station (38 km)
 Trivandrum International Airport (75 km)

References

Villages in Kollam district